Ben-Israel or Ben-Yisrael  is a Hebrew surname, literally meaning "son of Israel". Ben Israel is a Hebrew patronymic with the same meaning.

Notable people with the name include:

Surname
Ron Ben-Israel,  Israeli-American pastry chef
Isaac Ben-Israel,  Israeli military scientist, general and politician
Ben Ammi Ben-Israel
Gideon Ben-Yisrael
Danny Ben-Israel
Adi Ben-Israel

Patronymic
Menasseh Ben Israel (1604-1657), 
Moses Ben Israel Isserles (1530-1572), Polish Ashkenazic rabbi, talmudist, and posek 
Aharon Shmuel ben Israel Kaidanover
Solomon ben Israel Moses ha-Levi Alkabets
Joshua ben Israel Benveniste
Haim Ben Israel Benvenishti

See also

Bani Isra'il (disambiguation)
B'nai Israel (disambiguation)
Ben Yehuda (disambiguation)
Bar Yehuda

Hebrew-language surnames